

Events

Pre-1600
 610 – Heraclius arrives at Constantinople, kills Byzantine Emperor Phocas, and becomes emperor.
 816 – King Louis the Pious is crowned emperor of the Holy Roman Empire by the Pope.
 869 – The Fourth Council of Constantinople is convened to depose patriarch Photios I.
1143 – With the signing of the Treaty of Zamora, King Alfonso VII of León and Castile recognises Portugal as a Kingdom.
1450 – Louis IX, Duke of Bavaria expels Jews from his jurisdiction.

1601–1900
1607 – Assassins attempt to kill Venetian statesman and scientist Paolo Sarpi.
1789 – French Revolution: The Women's March on Versailles effectively terminates royal authority.
1813 – War of 1812: The Army of the Northwest defeats a British and Native Canadian force threatening Detroit.
1838 – The Killough massacre in east Texas sees eighteen Texian settlers either killed or kidnapped.
1869 – The Saxby Gale devastates the Bay of Fundy region in Canada.
  1869   – The Eastman tunnel, in Minnesota, United States, collapses during construction, causing a landslide that nearly destroys St. Anthony Falls. 
1877 – The Nez Perce War in the northwestern United States comes to an end.
1900 – Peace congress in Paris condemns British policy in South Africa and asserts Boer Republic's right to self-determination.

1901–present
1905 – The Wright brothers pilot the Wright Flyer III in a new world record flight of 24 miles in 39 minutes.
1910 – In a revolution in Portugal the monarchy is overthrown and a republic is declared.
1911 – The Kowloon–Canton Railway commences service.
1914 – World War I: An aircraft successfully destroys another aircraft with gunfire for the first time.
1921 – The World Series is the first to be broadcast on radio.
1930 – British airship R101 crashes in France en route to India on its maiden voyage killing 48 people.
1936 – The Jarrow March sets off for London.
1938 – In Nazi Germany, Jews' passports are invalidated.
1943 – Ninety-eight American POWs are executed by Japanese forces on Wake Island.
1944 – The Provisional Government of the French Republic enfranchises women.
1945 – A six-month strike by Hollywood set decorators turns into a bloody riot at the gates of the Warner Brothers studio.
1947 – President Truman makes the first televised Oval Office address.
1962 – The first of the James Bond film series, based on the novels by Ian Fleming, Dr. No, is released in Britain.
  1962 – The first Beatles single, Love Me Do is released in Britain.
1963 – The United States suspends the Commercial Import Program in response to repression of the Buddhist majority by the regime of President Ngo Dinh Diem.
1966 – A reactor at the Enrico Fermi Nuclear Generating Station near Detroit suffers a partial meltdown.
1968 – A Northern Ireland Civil Rights Association march in Derry is violently suppressed by police.
1970 – The Public Broadcasting Service (PBS) is founded.
  1970   – The British Trade Commissioner, James Cross, is kidnapped by members of the Front de libération du Québec, triggering the October Crisis in Canada.
1974 – Bombs planted by the PIRA in pubs in Guildford kill four British soldiers and one civilian.
1982 – Tylenol products are recalled after bottles in Chicago laced with cyanide cause seven deaths.
1984 – Marc Garneau becomes the first Canadian in space.
1986 – Mordechai Vanunu's story in The Sunday Times reveals Israel's secret nuclear weapons.
1988 – A Chilean opposition coalition defeats Augusto Pinochet in his re-election attempt.
1990 – After 150 years The Herald newspaper in Melbourne, Australia, is published for the last time as a separate newspaper.
1991 – An Indonesian Air Force C-130 crash kills 135 people.
1999 – The Ladbroke Grove rail crash in west London kills 31 people.
2000 – Mass demonstrations in Serbia force the resignation of Slobodan Milošević.
2011 – In the Mekong River massacre, two Chinese cargo boats are hijacked and 13 crew members murdered.

Births

Pre-1600
1274 – Al-Dhahabi, Syrian scholar and historian (d. 1348)
1338 – Alexios III of Trebizond (d. 1390)
1377 – Louis II of Anjou (d. 1417)
1422 – Catherine, Princess of Asturias, Spanish royal (d. 1424)
1487 – Ludwig of Hanau-Lichtenberg, German nobleman (d. 1553)
1520 – Alessandro Farnese, Italian cardinal and diplomat (d. 1589)
1524 – Rani Durgavati, Queen of Gond (d. 1564)

1601–1900
1609 – Paul Fleming, German physician and poet (d. 1640)
1641 – Françoise-Athénaïs, marquise de Montespan, French mistress of Louis XIV of France (d. 1707)
1658 – Mary of Modena (d. 1718)
1687 – Maria Maddalena Martinengo, Italian nun (d. 1737)
1703 – Jonathan Edwards, American pastor and theologian (d. 1758)
1712 – Francesco Guardi, Italian painter (d. 1793)
1713 – Denis Diderot, French philosopher and critic (d. 1784)
1715 – Victor de Riqueti, marquis de Mirabeau, French economist and educator (d. 1789)
1728 – Chevalier d'Éon, French diplomat and spy (d. 1810)
1743 – Giuseppe Gazzaniga, Italian composer and educator (d. 1818)
1781 – Bernard Bolzano, Czech mathematician and philosopher (d. 1848)
1792 – Joseph Crosfield, English businessman (d. 1844)
1795 – Alexander Keith, Scottish-Canadian brewer and politician, 13th Mayor of Halifax (d. 1873)
1803 – Friedrich Bernhard Westphal, Danish-German painter (d. 1844)
1816 – Ursula Frayne, Irish-Australian nun and missionary (d. 1885)
1820 – David Wilber, American lawyer and politician (d. 1890)
1824 – Henry Chadwick, English-American historian and author (d. 1908)
1829 – Chester A. Arthur, American general, lawyer, and politician, 21st President of the United States (d. 1886)
1844 – Francis William Reitz, South African lawyer and politician, 5th State President of the Orange Free State (d. 1934)
1848 – Guido von List, Austrian-German journalist and poet (d. 1919)
1850 – Sergey Muromtsev, Russian lawyer and politician (d. 1910)
1857 – Peadar Toner Mac Fhionnlaoich, Irish author and playwright (d. 1942)
1858 – Helen Churchill Candee, American journalist and author (d. 1949)
1864 – Louis Lumière, French director and producer (d. 1948)
1873 – Lucien Mérignac, French fencer (d. 1941)
1877 – Mike O'Neill, Irish-American baseball player and manager (d. 1959)
1878 – Louise Dresser, American actress (d. 1965)
1879 – Francis Peyton Rous, American pathologist and virologist, Nobel Prize laureate (d. 1970)
1882 – Robert H. Goddard, American physicist, engineer, and academic (d. 1945)
1883 – Ernst Pittschau, German actor (d. 1951)
1885 – Arunachalam Mahadeva, Sri Lankan politician and diplomat (d. 1969)
1887 – René Cassin, French judge and academic, Nobel Prize laureate (d. 1976)
  1887   – Manny Ziener, German actress (d. 1972)
1888 – Mary Fuller, American actress and screenwriter (d. 1973)
1889 – Teresa de la Parra, French-Venezuelan author and educator (d. 1936)
1892 – Remington Kellogg, American zoologist and paleontologist (d. 1969)
1894 – Bevil Rudd, South African runner and journalist (d. 1948)
1898 – Nachum Gutman, Moldovan-Israeli painter and sculptor (d. 1980)
1899 – Elda Anderson, American physicist and health researcher (d. 1961)
1900 – Bing Xin, Chinese author and poet, known for her contributions to children's literature (d. 1998)
  1900   – Margherita Bontade, Italian politician (d. 1992)

1901–present
1901 – John Alton, Austrian-American director and cinematographer (d. 1996)
1902 – Larry Fine, American comedian (d. 1975) 
  1902   – Ray Kroc, American businessman and philanthropist (d. 1984)
1903 – M. King Hubbert, American geophysicist and academic (d. 1989)
1905 – John Hoyt, American actor (d. 1991)
  1905   – Harriet E. MacGibbon, American actress (d. 1987)
1907 – Mrs. Miller, American novelty singer (d. 1997)
  1907   – Ragnar Nurkse, Estonian-American economist and academic (d. 1959)
1908 – Mehmet Ali Aybar, Turkish lawyer and politician (d. 1995)
  1908   – Joshua Logan, American director and screenwriter (d. 1988)
1911 – Pierre Dansereau, Canadian ecologist and academic (d. 2011)
  1911   – Brian O'Nolan, Irish author and playwright (d. 1966)
1912 – Fritz Fischer, German physician (d. 2003)
1913 – Eugene B. Fluckey, American admiral, Medal of Honor recipient (d. 2007)
1914 – Zhang Zhen, Chinese general and politician (d. 2015)
1916 – Stetson Kennedy, American author and activist (d. 2011)
1917 – Allen Ludden, American television personality and  game show host (d. 1981)
  1917   – Magda Szabó, Hungarian author and poet (d. 2007)
1919 – Donald Pleasence, English actor (d. 1995)
1921 – Bill Willis, American football player and coach (d. 2007)
1922 – José Froilán González, Argentinian racing driver (d. 2013)
  1922   – Bil Keane, American cartoonist (d. 2011)
  1922   – Jock Stein, Scottish footballer and manager (d. 1985)
1923 – Philip Berrigan, American priest and activist (d. 2002)
  1923   – Stig Dagerman, Swedish journalist and author (d. 1954)
  1923   – Albert Guðmundsson, Icelandic footballer and politician (d. 1994)
  1923   – Glynis Johns, South African-born British actress and singer 
  1923   – Kailashpati Mishra, Indian lawyer and politician, 18th Governor of Gujarat (d. 2012)
1924 – Bill Dana, American actor, producer, and screenwriter (d. 2017)
  1924   – José Donoso, Chilean author (d. 1996)
  1924   – Barbara Kelly, Canadian actress and screenwriter (d. 2007)
  1924   – Frederic Morton, Austrian-American banker, journalist, and author (d. 2015)
  1924   – Bob Thaves, American cartoonist (d. 2006)
1925 – Gail Davis, American actress (d. 1997)
  1925   – Herbert Kretzmer, South African-English journalist and songwriter (d. 2020)
  1925   – Walter Dale Miller, American lawyer and politician, 29th Governor of South Dakota (d. 2015)
1926 – Avraham Adan, Israeli general (d. 2012)
  1926   – Willi Unsoeld, American mountaineer and educator (d. 1979)
1928 – Louise Fitzhugh, American author and illustrator (d. 1974)
1929 – Richard F. Gordon Jr., American captain, pilot, and astronaut (d. 2017)
  1929   – Bill Wirtz, American businessman (d. 2007)
1930 – Pavel Popovich, Ukrainian general, pilot, and cosmonaut (d. 2009)
  1930   – Reinhard Selten, German economist and mathematician, Nobel Prize laureate (d. 2016)
1931 – Rosalie Gower, Canadian nurse and politician (d. 2013)
1932 – Neal Ascherson, Scottish journalist and author
  1932   – Dean Prentice, Canadian ice hockey player (d. 2019) 
  1932   – Michael John Rogers, English ornithologist and police officer (d. 2006)
1933 – Doug Bailey, American political consultant, founded The Hotline (d. 2013)
  1933   – Billy Lee Riley, American rockabilly musician, singer-songwriter, and record producer (d. 2009)
1934 – Kenneth D. Taylor, Canadian businessman and diplomat (d. 2015)
1936 – Václav Havel, Czech poet, playwright, and politician, 1st President of the Czech Republic (d. 2011)
1937 – Carlo Mastrangelo, American doo-wop singer (d. 2016)
  1937   – Barry Switzer, American football player and coach
1938 – Johnny Duncan, American country singer (d. 2006)
  1938   – Teresa Heinz, Mozambican-American businesswoman and philanthropist
1939 – Marie-Claire Blais, Canadian author and playwright
  1939   – A. R. Penck, German painter and sculptor (d. 2017)
  1939   – Consuelo Ynares-Santiago, Filipino lawyer and jurist
1940 – Terry Trotter, American jazz pianist
1941 – Stephanie Cole, English actress
  1941   – Eduardo Duhalde, Argentinian lawyer and politician, 50th President of Argentina
1942 – Richard Street, American singer-songwriter (d. 2013)
1943 – Ben Cardin, American lawyer and politician
  1943   – Steve Miller, American singer-songwriter and guitarist 
  1943   – Michael Morpurgo, English author, poet, and playwright
1944 – Richard Rosser, Baron Rosser, English union leader and politician
1946 – Zahida Hina, Pakistani journalist and author
  1946   – Robin Lane Fox, English historian and author
  1946   – Jean Perron, Canadian ice hockey player, coach, and sportscaster
  1946   – David Watson, English footballer
1947 – Michèle Pierre-Louis, Haitian politician, 14th Prime Minister of Haiti
1948 – Russell Mael, American vocalist 
1949 – Peter Ackroyd, English biographer, novelist and critic
  1949   – Michael Gaughan (Irish republican) Irish Hunger Striker (d. 1974)
  1949   – Ralph Goodale, Canadian lawyer and politician, 36th Canadian Minister of Finance
  1949   – Bill James, American historian and author
  1949   – Yashiki Takajin, Japanese singer and television host (d. 2014)
1950 – "Fast" Eddie Clarke, English rock guitarist (d. 2018)
  1950   – Jeff Conaway, American actor and singer (d. 2011)
  1950   – Edward P. Jones, American novelist and short story writer
  1950   – James Rizzi, American painter and illustrator (d. 2011)
1951 – Karen Allen, American actress
  1951   – Bob Geldof, British singer-songwriter and actor 
1952 – Clive Barker, English author, director, producer, and screenwriter
  1952   – Harold Faltermeyer, German keyboard player, composer, and producer
  1952   – Imran Khan, Pakistani cricketer and Prime Minister
1953 – Philip Hampton, English-Scottish accountant and businessman
  1953   – Roy Laidlaw, Scottish rugby player
1955 – John Alexander, English footballer
  1955   – Jean-Jacques Lafon, French singer-songwriter
  1955   – Adair Turner, Baron Turner of Ecchinswell, English academic and businessman
1957 – Mark Geragos, American lawyer
  1957   – Lee Thompson, English singer-songwriter and saxophonist 
  1957   – Bernie Mac, American actor, comedian, producer, and screenwriter (d. 2008)
1958 – André Kuipers, Dutch physician and astronaut
  1958   – Neil Peart, Australian footballer
  1958   – Neil deGrasse Tyson, American astrophysicist, cosmologist, and author
1959 – Maya Lin, American architect and sculptor, designed the Vietnam Veterans Memorial and Civil Rights Memorial
  1959   – Kelly Joe Phelps, American singer-songwriter and guitarist (d. 2022)
  1959   – Kenan İpek, Turkish lawyer and judge
1960 – Careca, Brazilian footballer
  1960   – Daniel Baldwin, American actor, director, and producer
  1960   – David Kirk, New Zealand rugby player and coach
1961 – Pato Banton, English singer-songwriter
1962 – Michael Andretti, American race car driver
  1962   – Thomas Herbst, German footballer and manager
  1962   – Caron Keating, British television host (d. 2004)
1963 – Laura Davies, English golfer and sportscaster
  1963   – Tony Dodemaide, Australian cricketer
  1963   – Michael Hadschieff, Austrian speed skater
  1963   – Nick Robinson, English journalist and blogger
1964 – Philip A. Haigh, English historian and author
  1964   – Malik Saidullaev, Russian businessman
  1964   – Korina Sanchez, Filipino journalist
1965 – Trace Armstrong, American football player and agent
  1965   – Mario Lemieux, Canadian ice hockey player
  1965   – Patrick Roy, Canadian ice hockey player and coach
1966 – Dennis Byrd, American football player (d. 2016)
  1966   – Sean M. Carroll, American physicist, cosmologist, and academic
  1966   – Terri Runnels, American wrestler and manager
  1966   – Jan Verhaas, Dutch snooker player and referee
1967 – Rex Chapman, American basketball player and sportscaster
  1967   – Guy Pearce, English-Australian actor 
1970 – Josie Bissett, American actress
  1970   – Matthew Knights, Australian footballer and coach
  1970   – Tord Gustavsen, Norwegian pianist and composer
  1970   – Cal Wilson, New Zealand comedian, actress, and screenwriter
1971 – Tonia Antoniazzi, British politician
  1971   – Mauricio Pellegrino, Argentinian footballer and manager
1972 – Annely Akkermann, Estonian banker and politician
  1972   – Aaron Guiel, Canadian baseball player
  1972   – Grant Hill, American basketball player and actor
  1972   – Thomas Roberts, American journalist and actor
1973 – Cédric Villani, French mathematician and academic
1974 – Rich Franklin, American mixed martial artist and actor
  1974   – Anousjka van Exel, Dutch tennis player
1975 – Bobo Baldé, French-Guinean footballer
  1975   – Carson Ellis, American painter and illustrator
  1975   – Parminder Nagra, English actress
  1975   – Monica Rial, American voice actress, director, and screenwriter
  1975   – Kate Winslet, English actress 
1976 – Ramzan Kadyrov, Russian-Chechen general and politician, 3rd President of the Chechen Republic
  1976   – Royston Tan, Singaporean director, producer, and screenwriter
  1976   – J. J. Yeley, American race car driver
1977 – Hugleikur Dagsson, Icelandic author, illustrator, and critic
  1977   – Vinnie Paz, Italian-American rapper and producer 
  1977   – Konstantin Zyryanov, Russian footballer 
1978 – Jesse Palmer, Canadian football player and sportscaster
  1978   – Shane Ryan, Irish footballer and hurler
  1978   – Steinar Nickelsen, Norwegian organist and composer
  1978   – Morgan Webb, Canadian-American television host and producer
1979 – Vince Grella, Australian footballer
  1979   – Curtis Sanford, Canadian ice hockey player
1980 – Paul Thomas, American bass player 
  1980   – James Toseland, English motorcycle racer
1981 – Jeanette Antolin, American gymnast
  1981   – Joel Lindpere, Estonian footballer
  1981   – Andy Nägelein, German footballer
1982 – Michael Roos, Estonian-American football player
  1982   – Steve Williams, Australian-German rugby player
1983 – Jesse Eisenberg, American actor and writer
  1983   – Florian Mayer, German tennis player
  1983   – Mashrafe Mortaza, Bangladeshi cricketer
1984 – Naima Adedapo, American singer and dancer
  1984   – Kenwyne Jones, Trinidadian footballer
1985 – Nicola Roberts, English singer-songwriter
1986 – Mladen Bartulović, Croatian footballer
1987 – Dillon Francis, American DJ and record producer
  1987   – Kevin Mirallas, Belgian footballer
  1987   – Tim Ream, American soccer player
  1987   – Park So-yeon, South Korean singer, dancer, and actress 
  1987   – Luigi Vitale, Italian footballer
1988 – Benny Howell, English cricketer
  1988   – Bahar Kızıl, German singer-songwriter
  1988   – Maja Salvador, Filipino actress, dancer, singer, and host
1989 – Kelsey Adrian, Canadian basketball player
  1989   – Marcel Baude, German footballer
  1989   – Ify Ibekwe, American basketball player
  1989   – Travis Kelce, American football player
1990 – Nathan Peats, Australian rugby league player
1992 – Kevin Magnussen, Danish racing driver
1993 – Wakamotoharu Minato, Japanese sumo wrestler
2006 – Jacob Tremblay, Canadian actor

Deaths

Pre-1600
 578 – Justin II, Byzantine emperor (b. 520)
 610 – Phocas, Byzantine emperor 
 989 – Henry III, duke of Bavaria (b. 940)
1056 – Henry III, Holy Roman Emperor (b. 1016)
1111 – Robert II, count of Flanders (b. 1065)
1112 – Sigebert of Gembloux, French monk, historian, and author (b. 1030)
1214 – Alfonso VIII, king of Castile and Toledo (b. 1155)
1225 – Al-Nasir, Abbasid caliph (b. 1158)
1285 – Philip III, king of France (b. 1245)
1354 – Giovanni Visconti, Italian cardinal (b. 1290)
1398 – Blanche of Navarre, queen of France (b. 1330)
1399 – Raymond of Capua, Italian priest and Master General (b. c. 1330)
1524 – Joachim Patinir, Flemish landscape painter (b. c. 1480)
1528 – Richard Foxe, English bishop and academic (b. 1448)
1540 – Helius Eobanus Hessus, German poet and educator (b. 1488)
1564 – Pierre de Manchicourt, Flemish composer and educator (b. 1510)
1565 – Lodovico Ferrari, Italian mathematician and academic (b. 1522)

1601–1900
1606 – Philippe Desportes, French poet and author (b. 1546)
1629 – Heribert Rosweyde, Jesuit hagiographer (b. 1569)
1714 – Kaibara Ekken, Japanese botanist and philosopher (b. 1630)
1740 – Jean-Philippe Baratier, German astronomer and scholar (b. 1721)
1777 – Johann Andreas Segner, Slovak-German mathematician, physicist, and physician (b. 1704)
1802 – Sanité Bélair, Haitian freedom fighter (b. 1781)
1805 – Charles Cornwallis, 1st Marquess Cornwallis, English general and politician, Lord Lieutenant of Ireland (b. 1738)
1813 – Tecumseh, American tribal leader (b. 1768)
1827 – William Mullins, 2nd Baron Ventry, Anglo-Irish politician and peer (b. 1761)
1848 – Joseph Hormayr, Baron zu Hortenburg, Austrian-German historian and politician (b. 1781)
1861 – Antoni Melchior Fijałkowski, Polish archbishop (b. 1778)
1880 – Jacques Offenbach, German-French cellist and composer (b. 1819)
1885 – Thomas C. Durant, American railroad tycoon (b. 1820)
1895 – Ralph Tollemache, English priest (b. 1826)

1901–present
1913 – Hans von Bartels, German painter and educator (b. 1856)
1914 – Albert Solomon, Australian politician, 23rd Premier of Tasmania (b. 1876)
1918 – Roland Garros, French soldier and pilot (b. 1888)
1921 – John Storey, Australian politician, 20th Premier of New South Wales (b. 1869)
1927 – Sam Warner, Polish-American director, producer, and screenwriter, co-founded Warner Bros. (b. 1887)
1929 – Varghese Payyappilly Palakkappilly, Indian priest, founded the Sisters of the Destitute (b. 1876)
1930 – Christopher Thomson, 1st Baron Thomson, Indian-English soldier and politician, Secretary of State for Air (b. 1875)
1933 – Renée Adorée, French-American actress (b. 1898)
  1933   – Nikolai Yudenich, Russian general (b. 1862)
1936 – J. Slauerhoff, Dutch poet and author (b. 1898)
1938 – Faustina Kowalska, Polish nun and saint (b. 1905)
  1938   – Albert Ranft, Swedish actor and director (b. 1858)
1940 – Ballington Booth, English-American activist, co-founded the Volunteers of America (b. 1857)
  1940   – Lincoln Loy McCandless, American rancher and politician (b. 1859)
  1940   – Silvestre Revueltas, Mexican violinist, composer, and conductor (b. 1889)
1941 – Louis Brandeis, American lawyer and jurist (b. 1856)
1942 – Dorothea Klumpke, American astronomer (b. 1861)
1943 – Leon Roppolo, American clarinet player and composer (b. 1902)
1950 – Frederic Lewy, German-American neurologist and academic (b. 1885)
1952 – Joe Jagersberger, Austrian racing driver (b. 1884)
1967 – Clifton Williams, American astronaut (b. 1932)
1976 – Barbara Nichols, American actress (b. 1928)
  1976   – Lars Onsager, Norwegian-American chemist and physicist, Nobel Prize laureate (b. 1903)
1981 – Gloria Grahame, American actress (b. 1923)
1983 – Humberto Mauro, Brazilian director and screenwriter (b. 1897)
  1983   – Earl Tupper, American inventor and businessman, founded the Tupperware Corporation (b. 1907)
1985 – Karl Menger, Austrian-American mathematician from the Vienna Circle (b. 1902)
1986 – Mike Burgmann, Australian racing driver and accountant (b. 1947)
  1986   – Hal B. Wallis, American film producer (b. 1898)
  1986   – James H. Wilkinson, English mathematician and computer scientist (b. 1919)
1992 – Eddie Kendricks, American singer-songwriter (b. 1939)
1996 – Seymour Cray, American engineer and businessman, founded CRAY Inc (b. 1925)
1997 – Brian Pillman, American football player and wrestler (b. 1962)
2000 – Johanna Döbereiner, Brazilian agronomist (b. 1924)
  2000   – Cătălin Hîldan, Romanian footballer (b. 1976)
2001 – Mike Mansfield, American soldier, politician, and diplomat, 22nd United States Ambassador to Japan (b. 1903)
2002 – Chuck Rayner, Canadian ice hockey player (b. 1920)
2003 – Dan Snyder, Canadian-American ice hockey player (b. 1978)
  2003   – Timothy Treadwell,  American environmentalist, director, and producer (b. 1957)
2004 – Rodney Dangerfield, American comedian, actor, producer, and screenwriter (b. 1921)
  2004   – William H. Dobelle, American biologist and academic (b. 1941)
  2004   – Maurice Wilkins, New Zealand-English physicist and biologist, Nobel Prize laureate (b. 1916)
2006 – Antonio Peña, Mexican wrestling promoter, founded Lucha Libre AAA World Wide (b. 1953)
2010 – Bernard Clavel, French journalist and author (b. 1923)
  2010   – Mary Leona Gage, American model and actress, Miss USA 1957 (b. 1939)
  2010   – Steve Lee, Swiss singer-songwriter (b. 1963)
2011 – Derrick Bell, American academic and scholar (b. 1930)
  2011   – Bert Jansch, Scottish singer-songwriter and guitarist (b. 1943)
  2011   – Steve Jobs, American businessman, co-founder of Apple Inc. and Pixar (b. 1955)
  2011   – Charles Napier, American actor and singer (b. 1936)
  2011   – Fred Shuttlesworth, American activist, co-founded the Southern Christian Leadership Conference (b. 1922)
  2011   – Gökşin Sipahioğlu, Turkish photographer and journalist (b. 1926)
2012 – Keith Campbell, English biologist and academic (b. 1954)
  2012   – Vojin Dimitrijević, Croatian-Serbian lawyer and activist (b. 1932)
  2012   – James W. Holley III, American dentist and politician (b. 1926)
  2012   – Edvard Mirzoyan, Georgian-Armenian composer and educator (b. 1921)
  2012   – Claude Pinoteau, French director and screenwriter (b. 1925)
2013 – Ruth R. Benerito, American chemist and academic (b. 1916)
  2013   – Carlo Lizzani, Italian actor, director, producer, and screenwriter (b. 1922)
  2013   – Yakkun Sakurazuka, Japanese voice actress and singer (b. 1976)
2014 – David Chavchavadze, English-American CIA officer and author (b. 1924)
  2014   – Andrea de Cesaris, Italian racing driver (b. 1959)
  2014   – Geoffrey Holder, Trinidadian-American actor, singer, dancer, and choreographer (b. 1930)
  2014   – Yuri Lyubimov, Russian actor and director (b. 1917)
2015 – Chantal Akerman, Belgian-French actress, director, and producer (b. 1950)
  2015   – Joker Arroyo, Filipino lawyer and politician (b. 1927)
  2015   – Grace Lee Boggs, American philosopher, author, and activist (b. 1915)
  2015   – Henning Mankell, Swedish author and playwright (b. 1948)
2016 – Brock Yates, American journalist and author (b. 1933)
2017 – Eberhard van der Laan, Dutch politician, mayor of Amsterdam (b. 1955)

Holidays and observances
 World Space Week (October 4–10)
 Armed Forces Day (Indonesia)
 Christian feast day:
 Anna Schäffer
 Faustina Kowalska
 Blessed Francis Xavier Seelos (Roman Catholic Church)
 Blessed Bartolo Longo
 Thraseas
 Hor and Susia (Coptic Orthodox Church of Alexandria)
 Placid and Maurus
 Placidus (martyr)
 October 5 (Eastern Orthodox liturgics)
 Constitution Day (Vanuatu)
 Engineer's Day (Bolivia)
 International Day of No Prostitution 
 Republic Day (Portugal)
 Teachers' Day (Pakistan)
 Teachers' Day (Russia)
 World Teachers' Day

References

External links

 
 
 

Days of the year
October